Escape to the Hills is a memoir by James and Ethel Chapman and published in 1947.

Plot
The book chronicles the Chapmans of Silliman University experiences as they escape to the hills and lived as fugitives in the mountains of Negros Oriental during the Japanese invasion of the Philippines,  as well as, their experiences when they were kept in the Santo Tomas Internment Camp.

References

External links
 The Chapman Family

1947 non-fiction books